Frederick Adolphus Bird (March 18, 1823 – November 30, 1884) was a political figure in Manitoba. He represented Portage la Prairie from 1870 to 1874 in the Legislative Assembly of Manitoba.

He was born in Carleton, Northwest Territories and educated in the Red River Colony. Bird married Ann Garriock.

He died in Portage la Prairie at the age of 61.

References 

1823 births
1884 deaths
Members of the Legislative Assembly of Manitoba
Métis politicians